Guillermo Durán and Máximo González were the defending champions, but González chose not to play this year. Guillermo Durán played alongside Andrés Molteni and lost in the first round to Guido Andreozzi and Guido Pella.

Martín Alund and Facundo Bagnis won the title by defeating Diego Schwartzman and Horacio Zeballos 4–6, 6–3, [10–7] in the final.

Seeds

Draw

Draw

References
 Main Draw

Copa San Juan Gobierno - Doubles
2014 Doubles
Copa